The 2023 Raptors de Naucalpan season is the Raptors de Naucalpan eight season in the Liga de Fútbol Americano Profesional (LFA) and their sixth under head coach Guillermo Gutiérrez.

Raptors will return to the Estadio José Ortega Martínez after playing the 2022 season at the Estadio FES Acatlán.

Raptors opened their season losing against their rivals the Dinos.

Draft

Roster

Regular season

Standings

Schedule

References

2023 in American football
Raptors